El pueblo unido (EnglishThe people united) can refer - in part - to any of the following:

Music 
El pueblo unido jamás será vencido, a song by the Chilean composer Sergio Ortega and Quilapayún (1973).
El Pueblo Unido Jamás Será Vencido (album), a Quilapayún music album from 1975.
The People United Will Never Be Defeated! a piano composition by the American composer Frederic Rzewski (1975).

Political organisations 
Pueblo Unido, political coalition of Marxist parties in Costa Rica founded in 1978.
Electoral Front United People, was an electoral front headed by the Portuguese Communist Party in 1976.
United People Alliance (Spanish:Alianza Pueblo Unido), a left-wing political coalition in Portugal in 1983.

Spanish words and phrases